The World Figure Skating Championships is an annual figure skating competition sanctioned by the International Skating Union in which figure skaters compete for the title of World Champion.

The competition took place on February 12 in Davos, Switzerland. All judges came from Switzerland; however, there were no distortions in the judging, because there was no Swiss competitor.

Results

Men

Judges:
 Mr. H. Günther 
 Mr. F. Stahel 
 Mr. P. Birum 
 Mr. C. Steffens 
 Mr. J. Olbeter

Sources
 Result List provided by the ISU

World Figure Skating Championships
World Figure Skating Championships, 1899
1899 in Swiss sport
International figure skating competitions hosted by Switzerland
Sport in Davos
February 1899 sports events